San Yu Htwe (born 14 October 1986) is a Burmese recurve archer from Mindat. She competed in the archery competition at the 2016 Summer Olympics in Rio de Janeiro, where she ranked at #51 in the ranking round. She defeated Taru Kuoppa in the first round and Mackenzie Brown in the second round but lost to the then current Olympic Champion Ki Bo-bae in the third round. She said that she felt too excited to be competing against the current Olympic Champion that her performance was not as good as she hoped.

References

External links
 
 
 

Burmese female archers
Living people
People from Chin State
1986 births
Archers at the 2016 Summer Olympics
Olympic archers of Myanmar